Salukara is a type of pancake of the Waray people in Eastern Samar, Philippines. It is made with galapong (or glutinous rice flour), coconut milk, sugar, and water, the same ingredients to make the cake called bibingka. Traditionally tubâ (palm wine) is used as the leavening agent, giving the pancakes a slightly sour aftertaste, though standard baker's yeast can be substituted. They are cooked in a pan or clay pot traditionally greased with pork lard or lined with banana leaves. They are commonly eaten for breakfast and for merienda.

See also

 Daral (food)
 Morón
 Puto (food)
 Kakanin
 Serabi

References

External links

Philippine rice dishes
Philippine desserts
Pancakes
Foods containing coconut
Rice cakes